Gruesome Twosome may refer to:
 A Gruesome Twosome, a 1945 Warner Bros. Merrie Melodies cartoon featuring Tweety Bird
 The Gruesome Twosome (1967 film), film directed by Herschell Gordon Lewis
 The Gruesome Twosome in the Creepy Coupe 02, recurring characters in the animated 1968 Hanna-Barbera series, Wacky Races
 The Gruesome Twosome Tour, a 2010 concert tour featuring Rob Zombie and Alice Cooper
 "Gruesome Twosome", a 1961 episode of The Dick Tracy Show
A nickname for Frank and Charlie, from the TV series It’s Always Sunny in Philadelphia.